Villar de los Pisones is a locality in the municipality of Asturianos, province of Zamora, Castile and León, Spain. According to the 2014 census (INE), the locality has a population of 16 inhabitants.

See also
List of municipalities in Zamora

References

Municipalities of the Province of Zamora